Stadio Renato Dall'Ara is a multi-purpose stadium in Bologna, Italy.  It is currently used mostly for football matches and the home of Bologna F.C.. The stadium was built in 1927 and holds 38,279. It has also been named Stadio Littoriale.  It replaced the Stadio Sterlino. The stadium is named after Renato Dall'Ara (1892–1964), a former president of Bologna for thirty years.

The stadium hosted matches in both the 1934 FIFA World Cup and the 1990 FIFA World Cup. The last match of the tournament played there was the England vs Belgium match in the Round of 16 which ended 1–0 courtesy of an extra-time goal scored by David Platt in the 119th minute.

Located in the Saragozza district, about 3.5 km from the center of the city, it regularly hosts Bologna's home matches.
With around 36,000 seats it is the eleventh Italian stadium for capacity, which can increase up to 55,000 for concerts.

International fixtures
The 17 November 1993 qualifier between San Marino and England finished with England winning 7–1, but only after the hosts scored in the opening seconds of the match. It was the quickest goal ever scored, by Davide Gualtieri of San Marino, taking 8.3 seconds to put his team ahead against England.

The stadium also hosted three international rugby union test match in 1995, Italy vs. All Blacks (the All Blacks won the game 70–6), in 1997 Italy vs. Springboks (the Springboks won the game) and Italy vs. Ireland (Italy won the game).

The stadium features as the lead song on the Los Campesinos! album 'Sick Scenes'.

1934 FIFA World Cup
The stadium was used for two matches during the 1934 FIFA World Cup.

1990 FIFA World Cup
The stadium was one of the venues of the 1990 FIFA World Cup.

It hosted the following matches:

References

External links

World Stadiums Article
Stadium Guide Article
Stadium Journey Article

Football venues in Italy
Serie A venues
Sports venues in Bologna
Multi-purpose stadiums in Italy
Bologna F.C. 1909
1934 FIFA World Cup stadiums
1990 FIFA World Cup stadiums
Sports venues completed in 1927
1927 establishments in Italy